Une fille comme moi is the third album by French singer Priscilla Betti. It was released on February 2, 2004, and was supported by the French top five hit "Toujours pas d'amour", followed by the singles "Toi c'est moi" and "Jalousie" which achieved a moderate success in comparison. Une fille comme moi is Priscilla's most successful album, reaching the top ten in France.

All songs are composed by Philippe Osman (music, arrangements) and Bertrand Châtenet (lyrics, mixing).

According to the Swiss Charts website, the talent of the singer is confirmed throughout this album. The style is varied with pop songs such as "Toi c'est moi" or "Jalousie". The singer's voice and sense of rhythm are underlined on "Juste pour savoir" or "Quand le ciel..."

Track listing
 "Toujours pas d'amour" — 3:33
 "Toi c'est moi" — 3:47
 "Banquise" — 3:54
 "Juste pour savoir" — 3:54
 "Une fille comme moi" — 4:05
 "Loin de ma famille" — 3:31
 "Où est le problème" — 3:46
 "Jalousie" - 3:39
 "Quand le ciel..." — 3:59
 "Un jour sur deux" — 3:37
 "Toujours pas d'amour" (remix) — 3:26

Personnel
 Lyrics by Bertrand Châtenet
 Music by Philippe Osman
 Arrangement, programmation and all instruments by Philippe Osman
 Mixing by Bertrand Châtenet
 Vocals by Priscilla
 Remixed version by Ghost
 Produced by B.Châtenet, P.Osman and P.Debort
 Produced by Patrick Debort and Denys Limon for Cap Mistral Corporation
 Edited by Mache Prod
 Recorded at Guillaume Tell and Mega studios in Suresnes

Charts

Peak positions

Year-end charts

Certifications

References

2004 albums
Priscilla Betti albums